The 2022 Orange Bowl was a college football bowl game played on December 30, 2022, at Hard Rock Stadium in Miami Gardens, Florida. The 89th annual Orange Bowl, the game featured Clemson from the Atlantic Coast Conference (ACC) and Tennessee from the Southeastern Conference (SEC). The game began at 8:11p.m. EST and was aired on ESPN. It was one of the 2022–23 bowl games concluding the 2022 FBS football season. Sponsored by bank holding company Capital One, the game was officially known as the Capital One Orange Bowl.

Teams
This game featured the No. 6 College Football Playoff (CFP) ranked team, Tennessee of the Southeastern Conference (SEC), and the No. 7 CFP ranked team, Clemson of the Atlantic Coast Conference (ACC).

Tennessee

Tennessee received a New Year's Six bid after finishing the regular season ranked higher than Power 5 champions Kansas State, Utah, and Clemson. The Volunteers started their regular season with eight consecutive wins, reaching No. 1 in major poll rankings. They then lost two of their final four games, suffering defeats by Georgia and South Carolina. Tennessee entered the bowl with an overall 10–2 record (6–2 in conference).

Clemson

Clemson received a New Year's Six bid after winning the ACC championship. The Tigers began their season with eight consecutive wins, reaching No. 5 in major poll rankings, then lost two of their final four regular-season games. Their defeats came against Notre Dame and South Carolina. Clemson qualified for the ACC Championship Game, where they defeated North Carolina, 39–10. Clemson entered the bowl with an overall 11–2 record (8–0 in conference).

Game summary

Statistics

References

Orange Bowl
Orange Bowl
Clemson Tigers football bowl games
Tennessee Volunteers football bowl games
Orange Bowl
Orange Bowl